Gilles Peycelon (born July 3, 1960, in Saint-Étienne, France) is a former professional footballer who played as a midfielder. Peycelon is now a lawyer in Saint-Étienne with his own Law Office.

External links
Gilles Peycelon profile at chamoisfc79.fr

1960 births
Living people
French footballers
Association football midfielders
AS Saint-Étienne players
Chamois Niortais F.C. players
Ligue 1 players
Ligue 2 players
AS Saint-Priest players
Footballers from Saint-Étienne

Association football defenders